Bhekizizwe Abram Radebe (born 4 November 1965) is a South African politician who has been a member of the National Assembly of South Africa from the Free State since 1999. He is a member of the African National Congress.

Background
Radebe was born on 4 November 1965. He has a Bachelor of Physical Education from the University of Zululand and a Master of Business Administration from Nelson Mandela University.

He was president of the Thembalihle Youth Congress. Radebe also served as the chairperson of the Thembalihle African National Congress branch and later as the regional chairperson of the ANC's Frankfort region.

Parliamentary career
First elected in 1999 and re-elected subsequently, Radebe has sat on a number of parliamentary committees, including the Portfolio Committee on International Relations and Cooperation, the Portfolio Committee on Trade and Industry, the Portfolio Committee on Public Works, and the Portfolio Committee on Agriculture and Land. As of June 2019, Radebe sits on the Joint Standing Committee on Financial Management of Parliament.

References

External links

Radebe, Bhekizizwe Abram at African National Congress Parliamentary Caucus

Living people
1965 births
Zulu people
People from the Free State (province)
University of Zululand alumni
Nelson Mandela University alumni
African National Congress politicians
Members of the National Assembly of South Africa